German submarine U-602 was a Type VIIC U-boat built for Nazi Germany's Kriegsmarine for service during World War II.
She was laid down on 8 February 1941 by Blohm & Voss, Hamburg as yard number 578, launched on 30 October 1941 and commissioned on 29 December 1941 under Oberleutnant zur See Philipp Schüler.

Design
German Type VIIC submarines were preceded by the shorter Type VIIB submarines. U-602 had a displacement of  when at the surface and  while submerged. She had two shafts and two  propellers.

U-602 was fitted with five  torpedo tubes (four fitted at the bow and one at the stern), fourteen torpedoes, one  SK C/35 naval gun, 220 rounds, and a  C/30 anti-aircraft gun. The boat had a complement of between forty-four and sixty.

Service history
The boat's career began with training at 5th U-boat Flotilla on 29 December 1941, followed by active service on 1 October 1942 as part of the 7th Flotilla. She later transferred for operations in the Mediterranean with 29th Flotilla for the remainder of her service.

In four patrols she was credited with the total loss of one warship (1,540 tons).

Wolfpacks
U-602 took part in two wolfpacks, namely:
 Panther (6 – 16 October 1942)
 Puma (16 – 29 October 1942)

Fate
U-602 went missing in the Mediterranean. She left the Military port of Toulon on 11 April 1943, and sent the last radio message on 19 April 1943 at position . All hands were lost.

Previously recorded fate
U-602 was originally thought to have been sunk on April 23, 1943 at position  by depth charges from a British Hudson aircraft of RAF 500/N. This attack was actually against , inflicting no damage.

Summary of raiding history

See also
 Mediterranean U-boat Campaign (World War II)

References

Notes

Citations

Bibliography

External links

German Type VIIC submarines
1941 ships
U-boats commissioned in 1941
U-boats sunk in 1943
World War II shipwrecks in the Mediterranean Sea
World War II submarines of Germany
Ships built in Hamburg
Missing U-boats of World War II
U-boats sunk by unknown causes
Maritime incidents in April 1943